Ann Sutherland is a former Welsh international lawn and indoor bowler.

Bowls career
She was born in 1943 and in 1995 she won the triples silver medal at the Atlantic Bowls Championships.

In 1998, she won the bronze medal in the pairs with Rita Jones at the 1998 Commonwealth Games in Kuala Lumpur.

Four years later she won another bronze in the fours with Gill Miles, Pam John and Nina Shipperlee at the 2002 Commonwealth Games in Manchester.

She was a Welsh international from 1986 until 2003 and is the winner of three National Indoor Titles.

References

Living people
1943 births
Bowls players at the 2002 Commonwealth Games
Commonwealth Games medallists in lawn bowls
Welsh female bowls players
Commonwealth Games bronze medallists for Wales
Medallists at the 1998 Commonwealth Games
Medallists at the 2002 Commonwealth Games